Kyle Abbott can refer to:

 Kyle Abbott (baseball) (born 1968), American baseball player
 Kyle Abbott (cricketer) (born 1987), South African cricketer
 Kyle Abbott (The Young and the Restless), a character in The Young and the Restless